Edward Henry Embley (28 February 1861 – 9 May 1924) was an Australian physician who studied the effects of chloroform on the human body.

Embley was born at Castlemaine, Victoria, younger son of Richard Edward Embley, a baker, and his wife Mary, née Smith, who both came from Gloucestershire, England. He was educated at Castlemaine Grammar School, the Bendigo High School and the University of Melbourne, where he graduated M.B., B.S. in 1889. He practised in Latrobe-street, Melbourne, and taking much interest in anaesthetics, gained the degree of M.D. in 1901 with a thesis on that subject. There had been various investigations into the question of the safe administration of anaesthetics, but Embley was not satisfied with the conclusions arrived at and made a comprehensive inquiry into the problem. In 1902 he was able to show "that heart muscle is very sensitive to chloroform poisoning, that this drug raises the excitability of the vagus, that deaths in the induction stage of anaesthesia are syncopal and unconcerned with respiration, that failure of respiration is mainly due to fall of blood pressure, and that in the post-indication stages of anaesthesia there is a general depression of all activities and no longer syncope through excited vagus action".

This was Embley's most important achievement, and the value of his work was widely recognized. Embley continued his investigations into various aspects of the subject for many years, and was honorary anaesthetist to the Melbourne hospital until 1917. Ill-health caused his retirement from practice in 1920 and he died of cerebro-vascular disease at Melbourne after a long illness on 9 May 1924. He married and left a widow and two daughters. In 1929 the International Anesthesia Research Society held a memorial dinner in Chicago, and presented a scroll of honour to the University of Melbourne. Embley was awarded the first David Syme Research Prize at the University of Melbourne in 1906.

References

Geoffrey Kaye, 'Embley, Edward Henry (1861 - 1924)', Australian Dictionary of Biography, Volume 8, MUP, 1981, pp 436–437. Retrieved on 12 October 2008

1861 births
1924 deaths
Australian anaesthetists